Exis (stylized as EXIS) is the debut extended play by Canadian recording artist Roy Woods. It was released on July 31, 2015, by OVO Sound and Warner Bros. Records. The EP's sole guest appearance comes from Canadian rapper and label-mate Drake. The official cover of Exis contains a picture of a white sketched tree with a blue background (representing "night time") and also the yellow moon. The back cover reveals the track list on one side of the moon. The first music video to be put out from the album was for the song "Jealousy". The video was directed by creative artist Jim Joe. It has received over 9,100,000 views since its release. Music videos for "Get You Good" and "Go Go Go" were released as well, garnering over 9,400,000 and 1,800,000 views respectively.

Track listing

Charts

Release history

References

2015 debut EPs
Roy Woods albums
Hip hop EPs
OVO Sound EPs